Abū ‘Abd al-Raḥmān ‘Abd Allāh ibn Ḥabīb ibn Rabī‘ah al-Sulamī was a blind ḥadīth narrator and qāriʾ (Qur’ān reciter) born during the lifetime of the Islamic prophet Muḥammad. His father, Ḥabīb ibn Rabī‘ah As-Sulamī, was a companion of Muḥammad.

Recitation of the Qur’ān 

Abū ‘Abdir-Raḥmān was known to have discussed the Qur’ān with Tajwīd, an ability he gained from ‘Uthmān, ‘Alī, Zaid ibn Thābit, Abdullāh ibn Mas‘ūd, and Ubayy ibn Ka‘b. He taught ‘Aṣim ibn Abin-Najūd, Yaḥyā ibn Wathāb, ‘Aṭā’ ibn As-Sā’ib, Abdullāh ibn ‘Īsā ibn ‘Abdir-Raḥmān ibn Abī Lailā, Muḥammad ibn Abī Ayyūb, ‘Āmir Ash-Sha‘bī, and Ismā‘īl ibn Abī Khālid. Beginning in the caliphate of ‘Uthmān ibn ‘Affān, he held classes showing the recitation of the Qur’ān to individuals in the Great Mosque of Al-Kūfah for many years until his death. Abū ‘Abdir-Raḥmān As-Sulamī never took payment for such recitations of the Qur’ān.

See also 
 Ḥafṣ
 Nāfi‘ Al-Madanī
 Warsh
 Ijazah

References

Quranic readings
People from Kufa
7th-century Arabs